The following are the records of Haiti in Olympic weightlifting. Records are maintained in each weight class for the snatch lift, clean and jerk lift, and the total for both lifts by the Fédération Haitienne d'Haltérophilie M.C.

Men

Women

References

records
Haiti
Olympic weightlifting
weightlifting